Born to Be Alive is the first studio album by Patrick Hernandez, released internationally in 1978 and in the US in 1979. It features the eponymous disco hit "Born to Be Alive" as well as a less-successful single, "Disco Queen".

Background
While a member of the French group Gold, Hernandez was signed by producer Jean Vanloo and left to Waterloo, Belgium to begin work on a solo album.  In November, 1978, the album was released on the Aariana sub-label Aquarius Records (in France). The first single released from the album was "Born to Be Alive". It found immediate success throughout Europe, and in January 1979, Hernandez received his first gold record from Italy. Just starting her career as a dancer, Madonna toured parts of Europe with Hernandez.

In early 1979, the album reached the US market with a release on the A-Tom-Mik label and later Columbia Records. The US release contained a remixed version of "Born to Be Alive" and found great success, peaking in the US Billboard Hot Dance Club Play chart at #1 and on the Billboard Hot 100 at #16. It sold over one million copies in the US.

Track listing

Charts

Weekly charts

Year-end charts

References

1978 debut albums